Prince Stanisław Herakliusz Lubomirski a.k.a. "Mirobulius Tassalinus" (4 March 1642 – 17 January 1702) was a Polish noble, politician, patron of the arts and writer.

Biography
Lubomirski was the son of Marshal and Hetman Jerzy Sebastian Lubomirski and Konstancja Ligęza. He was married to Zofia Opalińska, the daughter of Court Marshal Łukasz Opaliński, in 1669 and to Elżbieta Doenhoff in 1676.

He was Podstoli of the Crown from 1669, Court Marshal of the Crown from 1673, Grand Marshal of the Crown from 1676 and starost of Spisz.

Lubomirski fought in wars against Sweden and Hungary.  He participated with his father in the siege of Toruń in 1658. He refused to join the rokosz of his father and try to mediate between the rokoszans and the king.

He was a proponent of the vivente rege elections and supporter of the politics of queen Ludwika Maria.

He performed numerous diplomatic missions to France, Italy and Spain. He was against the abdication of king Jan II Kazimierz in 1668. From 1667 he was frequently deputy for the Sejm.

Owing to his experience and authority, the Sejm session in 1670 was not broken like the two sessions before, which were aborted by a veto.

During the interregnum in 1673–1674 he supported the candidature of his friend, Jan Sobieski for the Polish throne.

In contrast to his father, he was free of private ambitions and always acted according to the interests of the Republic.

He was variously talented. He became famous outside of Poland as the author of literary and scientific works. He wrote poems, plays and philosophical, religious and historical tracts. He was the founder and benefactor of schools and churches. 
 
As Sejm Marshal he led the Election Sejm from 2 May to 19 June 1669 and the ordinary Sejm from 9 September to 31 October 1670 in Warsaw.

Children
 Elżbieta Lubomirska married Hetman Adam Mikołaj Sieniawski. 
 Teodor Lubomirski became starost, voivode and Sejm Marshal. 
 Franciszek Lubomirski became General of the Crown Army.
 Józef Lubomirski became voivode.

Works
 Poezje postu Świętego (including Sonnet on the Great Suffering of Jesus Christ)
 Tobiasz wyzwolony, Ecclesiastes
 Ermida (sielanka)
 Rozmowy Artaksesa i Ewandra (1683)
 De vanitate consiliorum (1700)
 De remediis animi humani (1701)
 Genii veredici

References

External links 
 Stanisław Herakliusz Lubomirski, A Quiet Moment Comes After a Storm. Translated by Michael J. Mikoś.
 Stanisław Herakliusz Lubomirski, Somnus. Translated by Michael J. Mikoś.
Stanisław Herakliusz Lubomirski, Sonnet on the Great Suffering of Jesus Christ. Translated by Michael J. Mikoś.
   

Secular senators of the Polish–Lithuanian Commonwealth
Polish male dramatists and playwrights
1642 births
1702 deaths
Stanislaw Herakliusz
17th-century Polish dramatists and playwrights
17th-century male writers
Baroque writers